is a Japanese manga series written by Natsume Akatsuki and illustrated by Mattakumo-suke and Yumeuta. It has been serialized in Kadokawa Shoten's shōnen manga magazine Monthly Shōnen Ace since November 2016 and has been collected in eleven tankōbon volumes. An anime television series adaptation titled Kemono Michi: Rise Up by ENGI aired from October to December 2019.

Plot
Genzō Shibata is a famous professional wrestler, known in the world of wrestling as Animal Mask. The night of the match for the title of World Champion, he is suddenly teleported into a fantasy world by a princess, who asks him to act as a beast killer and free the kingdom from the beasts inhabiting the land. However, Genzō, an animal lover, immediately refuses the order by knocking out the princess with a German suplex.

Alone in a new world, Genzō soon sides with the wolf-girl Shigure, joining alongside her to the local guild and starting a new career as a beast hunter. However, instead of killing them, his goal is to befriend and capture as many monsters as possible, in order to realize his greatest dream: becoming the owner of a pet shop.

Characters

Main
 / 

 A famous pro wrestler teleported into a fantasy world to slay the Demon King and become the Hero. However, due to his deep love for animals, he refuses the idea of killing monsters, preferring instead to capture them alive to become the owner of a pet shop. His strong empathy with animals allows him to befriend almost every monster he meets in the blink of an eye, but when provoked, he proves to be an exceptional fighter. Unfortunately, despite his efforts, his successes in making monsters docile and friendly have made him earn the title of "Beast Killer" among the other hunters, much to his rage.

 Genzō's pet dog that was transported with him to the new world. He is frequently targeted for kidnap by Edgar, a criminal friend of Misha and Wolfgang, mostly to get revenge on Genzō but also because as the only known member of his species in the new world he is considered rare and valuable. As Genzō once put it, if he were to sell both Hiroyuki and Carmilla he would get far more for the dog than for her.

 A half human, half wolf beastman and one of Genzō's partners, Shigure is an extremely greedy and ambitious wolf girl who dreams of becoming rich. However, her terrible sense for affairs made her lose a large amount of gold she had received on loan from a group of loan sharks, forcing her to sign a contract as a slave to repay her debt. After having been saved by Genzō, she joins him in his quest to become a famous beast hunter, in order to collect enough money to realize her dream. Her most well-known gag is that when Genzō attacks the knight hero Heat Haze for attempting to annihilate the beasts with his swords, she steals the latter's swords and sells them, pretending to claim someone has "dropped" a sword "out of nowhere".

Hanako, real name , is a half human, half dragon and the sole heir of a noble family who left her castle to know the world. While she appears to look like a child with dragon horns and a tail, she is quite strong and resistant, while her endless hunger pushes her to consume any living thing she sees. She joins Genzō to fulfill her dream to taste the meat of every single monster in the world.

Hanako's trustworthy vampire maid. When Hanako joins Genzō, Carmilla followed along, despite her distaste for Genzō. Like most vampires, she fears holy water and garlic, and requires an umbrella when in sunlight. While appearing arrogant and spiteful towards Genzō, she tries to appease Hanako's every whim, which comes across as borderline obsessive. She is wasteful with any money they make and uses it strictly on alcohol for her own consumption.

A mysterious giant ant that works for Genzō. His motivations are unknown.

Other

Genzō's initial wrestling opponent for the title of World Champion, whose ring name is MAO. Their match was interrupted when Genzō was teleported into the other world by the princess, and has since searched endlessly for him so they can finish their bout. When the dark forces in the new world call for their own "hero", MAO is then teleported by the vampire princess Joanna, joining her people in the war against humans, and becoming the new Demon King.

 The heir princess of all vampires, whose people are fighting an endless war against humans and other species. Once she heard that the princess called Genzō in to their world to fight against them, she performs the same ritual to call the wrestler MAO, Genzō's wrestling nemesis, into their world, making him the vampires' champion.

Joanna's servant, she is the highest class of vampire. When Joanna says to Hanako that she could provide an even stronger vampire servant for her, Rose duels Carmilla to prove her point. After Rose wins easily, Hanako beats up both Joanna and Rose and says she is content with her current servant, faults and all.

 A half human, half cat beastman, she is approached by Genzō when he first arrived to the new world. His love for animals caused both her and her brother Wolfgang a lot of stress when he pet them and stroked their fur against their wills. Since then, she sees Genzō only as a pervert and is out for revenge in order to take him down.

 A wolf man and Misha's brother. While initially appearing gruff and brutal, he becomes fearful of the outdoors after his first encounter with Genzō as he fears to run into him again. Due to this, he is usually against Misha's plans for revenge against Genzō.

 A town merchant and companion of Misha and Wolfgang. Like Misha, he knows Genzō as only a pervert and helps her with her ideas of revenge.

The leader of an ogre village whose inhabitants use threatening and attacking humans. Once Genzō received the quest to put an end to the problem by the guild, he reaches the village and challenges the orc king into a wrestling match. After being defeated, the orc considers Genzō to be an honorable and trustworthy fighter, and agrees to keep his men far from human settlements from now on.

 The princess who summoned Genzō to the world. Immediately upon his arrival, she asks him to defeat the Demon King and the foul beasts that roam the land, only for him to suplex her, revealing her underwear to the world. Now, she is known as "Princess Buttocks" by everyone in the kingdom and still attempts to convince Genzō to slay the Demon King. Later, after being humiliated in one of her wrestling matches, she becomes a masochist.

A half human, half lizard beastman, she approaches Genzō to become his apprentice. After initially turning down her request, he eventually agrees after he realizes she is part lizard and that her belly and midsection are scaly.

A local bear-like beastman, she is dismissive of Genzō until he compliments her on her looks and fur, making her swoon and fall for him, even though she is married. She is seen frequently around town on the lookout for Genzō behind the back of her husband.

A local bear-like beastman, he is approached by Genzō to compete in the town wrestling match. While initially antagonistic of Genzō because of his wife's interactions, he agrees to participate after challenging and losing a duel with Genzō, gaining respect for him in the process.

Media

Manga
Kemono Michi is written by Natsume Akatsuki and illustrated by Mattakumo-suke and Yumeuta. It began serialization in Kadokawa Shoten's Monthly Shōnen Ace magazine on November 26, 2016. Kadokawa has collected its chapters into individual tankōbon volumes. The first volume was released on April 25, 2017. As of December 26, 2022, eleven volumes have been released.

Volume list

Anime
An anime adaptation was announced by Monthly Shōnen Ace on January 18, 2019. It was later announced that the adaptation would be a television series titled , with animation by ENGI. The series was directed by Kazuya Miura, with Touko Machida handling the series composition, and Tomoka Noumi designing the characters. It aired from October 2 to December 18, 2019 on AT-X, Tokyo MX, TVA, KBS, SUN, and BS11. It was also streamed on AbemaTV. NoB and Katsuyuki Konishi performed the series' opening theme song , while Momosumomosu performed the series' ending theme song . 

Funimation had licensed the series for a SimulDub. Following Sony's acquisition of Crunchyroll, the series was moved to Crunchyroll.

Episode list

Reception
Gadget Tsūshin listed "Kemono Mask", a phrase from Kemono Michi'''s opening song, in their 2019 anime buzzwords list.

Notes

References

External links
Kemono Michi at Monthly Shōnen Ace'' 
 

2019 anime television series debuts
Anime series based on manga
AT-X (TV network) original programming
Comedy anime and manga
Crunchyroll anime
ENGI
Isekai anime and manga
Kadokawa Dwango franchises
Kadokawa Shoten manga
Professional wrestling in anime and manga
Shōnen manga